Terra Formars is a Japanese manga series. An anime adaptation of the series began in Japan on September 26, 2014, and ran for 13 episodes, concluding on December 19, 2014. Two OVAs set before the main television series were also released, in August and November 2014. The opening theme is "AMAZING BREAK" by TERRASPEX while the ending theme is "Lightning" by TERRASPEX. The second opening theme from episodes 5-6, 8-9, 11, and 13 is "PLANET / THE HELL" by Seikima-II. The first ending theme from episodes 1-3 and 9 is "Red Zone" by Zwei. The second ending theme from 4-5 and 7-8 is "Strength" by Fuki. The third ending theme from episodes 6 and 10-12 is "Revolution" by nao.

OVAs

Episode list

Terra Formars

Terra Formars: Revenge

Terra Formars: Earth Arc (OVA)

Notes

References

Terra Formars